The Neighbours is a sculpture by Siegfried Charoux.  It was commissioned in 1957 using funds set aside by London County Council for public art in its housing projects and unveiled in 1959 at  the Quadrant Estate in Islington, N5, London, near Clissold Park. It became Grade II listed building in April 1998.

It depicts two life-size human figures, possibly intended to represent working men, sitting alongside each other on a bench. It was made using synthetic resin mixed with powdered stones, supported by a steel armature and fibreglass matting, creating an appearance similar to terracotta or cemented iron. It was renovated in 2009, in time for the 50th anniversary of its unveiling.

A  bronze maquette was sold for £2,250 by Christie's in 2011.

References
 The Neighbours sculpture at Highbury Quadrant Estate, National Heritage List for England Historic England
 The Neighbours, Robert Harris Conservation
 The Neighbours maquette, Christie's, 23 March 2011
 Birthday treat for The Neighbours, Islington Tribune, 4 September 2009

Grade II listed buildings in the London Borough of Islington
Outdoor sculptures in London